Vorticella convallaria is a species of ciliates. It is the type species of the genus Vorticella. It resembles V. campanula, but differs in being somewhat narrow in the anterior end and usually having no refractile granules in the endoplasm.

Vorticella convallaria exhibits two morphological types. The primary type is the sessile trophont stalked zooid. When environmental conditions deteriorate the stalked zooid excises its stalk and transforms into Vorticella's secondary type, the motile dispersive telotroch. When the telotroch finds suitable environs it reattaches to the substrate and transforms back into a stalked zooid.

The cell body of this species is 50-95 μm long and 35-53 μm wide. The peristome ranges from 55-75 μm in diameter. The rod-like, contractile stalk - the "spasmoneme" - is 25-300 μm long and 4 μm wide. It can collapse into a tightly coiled helix in less than 1/60th of a second. The contraction occurs when the negatively charged "spasmin" proteins that make up the spasmoneme are neutralized by binding with calcium, causing the stalk to collapse.

References

Further reading
 PAUL J. DE BAUFER, AMR A. AMIN†, SAMANTHA C. PAK‡ andHOWARD E. BUHSE JR*. 1999. A Method for the Synchronous Induction of Large Numbers of Telotrochs in Vorticella convallaria by Monocalcium Phosphate at Low pH. Journal of Eukaryotic Microbiology Volume 46, Issue 1, pages 12–16, January 1999
 Maciejewski, J.J., E.J. Vacchiano, S.M. McCutcheon & H.E. Buhse, Jr. 1999. Cloning and Expression of a cDNA Encoding a Vorticella convallaria Spasmin: an EF-Hand Calcium-Binding Protein. The Journal of Eukaryotic Microbiology 46(2): 165–173. 
Sallaq, R., D.H. van Winkle & J. Cao 2003. Determination of velocity, acceleration,and forces in the contraction of Vorticella convallaria. American Physical Society, Annual APS March Meeting 2003, March 3–7, 2003. Abstract #Y9.001
 Shiono, H. & Y. Naitoh 1997.  Journal of Experimental Biology 200(16): 2249–2261.
 Vacchiano, E., A. Dreisbach, D. Locascio, L. Castaneda, T. Vivian & H.E. Buhse, Jr. 1992. Morphogenetic Transitions and Cytoskeletal Elements of the Stalked Zooid and the Telotroch Stages in the Peritrich Ciliate Vorticella convallaria. The Journal of Eukaryotic Microbiology 39(1): 101–106.
 Wibel, R., E.J. Vacchiano & H.E. Buhse, Jr. 1993. Ultrastructural Study of the Cortex and Membrane Skeleton of Vorticella convallaria (Ciliophora: Peritricha). Transactions of the American Microscopical Society 112(2): 107–120.
 Paul J. De Baufer, Serhiy Pylawka, and Howard E. Buhse, Jr. 2000. Evidence for a Signal Transduction System Initiating Stalk Excision in Vorticella convallaria. Transactions of the Illinois State Academy of Science 93(2): 201-213

External links
 Protist Images: Vorticella convallaria
 Vorticella convallaria cytosol and food vacuoles

Oligohymenophorea
Species described in 1758
Taxa named by Carl Linnaeus